Joost Baljeu (1 November 1925 – 1 July 1991) was a Dutch painter, sculptor and writer. He is known for his large outdoor painted steel structures.

Life

Joost Baljeu was born in Middelburg on 1 November 1925. 
During World War II (1939–45) he began painting in an expressionist, realistic and semi-abstract idiom. After Cubism he evolved to constructivism. 
He made his first reliefs in 1954-55. 
From 1957 to 1972 he was a professor at the Royal Academy of Art, The Hague in the Hague.
The Canadian artist Eli Bornstein began to make three-dimensional "structurist" reliefs during a sabbatical in Italy and the Netherlands in 1957.
He met and was influenced by artists such as Jean Gorin, Joost Baljeu, Anthony Hill, Kenneth Martin, Mary Martin, Victor Pasmore and Georges Vantongerloo.

In 1958-59 Baljeu was a guest lecturer at the University of Saskatchewan in Canada.
In 1966 he was visiting professor at the Minneapolis School of Art in the US.
He died on 1 July 1991 in Amsterdam.

Work

Exhibitions
1965 Zonnehof, Amersfoort
1975/1976 Gemeentemuseum, The Hague
1979 Kröller-Müller Museum, Otterlo
1991 Stedelijk Museum, Amsterdam
2000 Steel in Picture (group) in Old Slot Heemstede: F19 (model 1986/87)

Museums
The Mondriaan House in Amersfoort
Kröller-Müller Museum in Otterlo. Two works are part of the museum: 
Synthetic Construction F5-2 CD (1966/68) and 
Synthetic Construction F15 No. 1. (1983/87), 
The Sculpture F26 1990 was donated to the museum in 1991 by Baljeu's widow.

Public spaces

Lightning (1955), Wijkcentrum Open Vaart, Meidoornplein in Amsterdam-Noord
Synthetic construction F8-1B (1978), Plesmanweg, The Hague
Wall sculpture (1980), police Burg. Wegstapel Square in Zoetermeer (architectural design of colored plexiglass panels in a two-story aluminum construction)
Synthetic construction F11 (1981), courtyard Vest in Dordrecht - reinstated in 1999
Synthetic construction F13 (1984), Avenue of the United Nations in Dordrecht - reinstated in 1999
F26 (1990) in the sculpture park of the Kröller-Müller Museum in Otterlo
Spacetime (I) (1989) in Rotterdam, Prince Alexander district
Spacetime II (restored in 2004) in Rotterdam, Prince Alexander

Publications
In 1958 Baljeu published Mondrian and Miró (published by Edition de Beek in Amsterdam)
From 1958 to 1964 he was responsible for the international journal Structure, a stage for the geometric abstract art.
From 1958 to 1962 he worked on the monograph Theo van Doesburg (published by Vista, London in 1974).

References
Citations

Sources

1925 births
1991 deaths
20th-century Dutch sculptors
Dutch male sculptors
20th-century Dutch painters
Dutch male painters
Academic staff of the Royal Academy of Art, The Hague
People from Middelburg, Zeeland
20th-century Dutch male artists